Cacique Blanco Airport is a public use airport located near Lago Verde, Aisén del General Carlos Ibañez del Campo, Chile.

See also
List of airports in Chile

References

External links 
 Airport record for Cacique Blanco Airport at Landings.com

Airports in Aysén Region